Leo Yankevich (30 October 1961 – 11 December 2018) was an American poet and the editor of The New Formalist.

Early life and education
Leo Yankevich grew up and attended high school in Farrell, Pennsylvania, a small steel town in western Pennsylvania. He studied History and Polish Studies at Alliance College, Cambridge Springs, Pennsylvania, receiving a BA in 1984.  Later that year he traveled to Poland on a fellowship from the Kosciuszko Foundation to attend Kraków's Jagiellonian University.

After the fall of the Iron Curtain in 1989, he decided to settle permanently in Poland. Thereafter, he lived in Gliwice, an industrial city in Upper Silesia.

Writing activities
Yankevich wrote poems in both traditional metre and in syllabics, and only occasionally in free verse. He was a prolific translator, having rendered into English poems by Mikhail Lermontov, Georg Trakl, Rainer Maria Rilke, Stanisław Grochowiak, Czesław Miłosz, Alexander Blok, Leopold Staff, Nikolay Gumilev, Bolesław Leśmian, and many others. He has a large internet presence with work published in scores of online publications, ranging from the Pittsburgh Post-Gazette to Poets Against War.

Personal life
Yankevich was married and had three sons.

Published works

Chapbooks
The Language of Birds; Pygmy Forest Press, 1994 
Grief's Herbs (translations after the Polish of Stanisław Grochowiak); The Mandrake Press, 1995
The Gnosis of Gnomes; The Mandrake Press, 1995
Epistle from The Dark; The Mandrake Press, 1996 
The Golem of Gleiwitz; The Mandrake Press, 1998 
"Metaphysics" by Leo Yankevich, 2002

Books
The Unfinished Crusade; The Mandrake Press, 2000 
The Last Silesian; The Mandrake Press, 2005 
Tikkun Olam; Counter-Currents Publishing, 2012 
Journey Late at Night: Poems & Translations; Counter-Currents Publishing, 2013 
The Hypocrisies of Heaven: Poems New & Old: ; Counter-Currents Publishing, 2016

References

Further reading
Poem at The Flea
Poems at The Formalist Portal
Poems at The Pennsylvania Review
Poem at the Pittsburgh Post-Gazette
Poems at The Monongahela Review
Poems at The Innisfree Poetry Journal
Poem at The East River Review
Poems at Hypertexts
Poems at Poemhunter.com
Poem at The Barefoot Muse
Poems at Poetry Porch
Poems at DMQ Review
Poem at Snakeskin
Poem at Beauty for Ashes

Internet Archive's copies

Internet Archive's copy of the Official Leo Yankevich Website
Internet Archive's copy of Leo Yankevich Poems at Poemhunter.com

1961 births
2018 deaths
People from Sharon, Pennsylvania
American people of Polish descent
Poets from Pennsylvania
Formalist poets
Jagiellonian University alumni
American online publication editors
Polish–English translators
Translators from Polish
21st-century American poets
20th-century translators